OLN (formerly Outdoor Life Network) is a Canadian English-language discretionary specialty channel owned by Rogers Sports & Media that primarily broadcasts factual-based and adventure-related reality programming aimed at male audiences.

The channel was launched on October 17, 1997 by Rogers, Baton Broadcasting and Outdoor Life Network in the U.S. with the "OLN" name licensed from Camden Media, owners of the Outdoor Life magazine brand. Rogers took sole ownership of the channel in 2008 and its original format was largely abandoned in recent years.

History
Licensed in September 1996 as Outdoor Life by the Canadian Radio-television and Telecommunications Commission (CRTC), the channel launched on October 17, 1997, as Outdoor Life Network. Its initial owners were Baton Broadcasting (later CTVglobemedia), Rogers Media, and the Outdoor Life Network in the U.S., which was later acquired by Comcast.

It was announced on November 16, 2007, that Rogers would acquire the remaining interests in OLN from both CTVglobemedia and Comcast, leaving Rogers as the sole owner of OLN. The deal was approved by the CRTC on July 7, 2008, and was finalized on August 1, 2008, with Rogers taking operational control on August 31, 2008.

On June 24, 2011, OLN launched their high definition feed. This feed is available on Shaw Direct, Bell Satellite TV, Eastlink, Optik TV, Bell MTS, SaskTel, Rogers, Cogeco, and Bell Fibe TV.

Programming
OLN was originally based on the American channel of the same name later known as NBCSN, which operated from 1995 to 2021, and shared much of its programmingincluding coverage of the Tour de France. Today, OLN primarily airs general-interest reality series with little to no relation to the network's original format (including original programs, such as Storage Wars: Canada and The Liquidator), and library programming from other Rogers channels including Citytv. Since 2023, 

Due to restrictions in its CRTC license that required it to maintain a focus on outdoors programming at the time, and because Rogers already operated several services under the Sportsnet brand, OLN did not follow the suit of its American counterpart and become a mainstream sports channel. However, OLN has been used for sports coverage, including CTV/Rogers Media coverage of the 2010 Winter Olympics and 2012 Summer Olympics. 

OLN occasionally carries WWE programs as an overflow from Sportsnet 360 when schedule conflicts arise in the latter's sports programming.

Since early January 2023, OLN now carries repeats of adult animated comedies including The Simpsons, Family Guy, Bob's Burgers, and American Dad!, sharing with FX.

References

External links
 

 
Rogers Communications
Television channels and stations established in 1997
English-language television stations in Canada
Men's interest channels
1997 establishments in Ontario